Cyrioides australis, commonly known as the dark blue banksia jewel beetle, is a species of beetle in the family Buprestidae native to southeastern Australia. It was described by the French entomologist Jean Baptiste Boisduval in 1835.  Banksia integrifolia has been recorded as a host plant.

References

Buprestidae
Beetles described in 1835